Norwegian county road 418 (Fv418) is a Norwegian county road in Agder county, Norway. The route from Aspelund to Sundebru used to be part of the European route E18 highway.

Municipalities and junctions

Aust-Agder county

Risør
 Aspelund
 from Vormli to Kvernvik (1.1 km)
 from Søndeled to Hasåsmyr
 Søndeled
Gjerstad
 from Fiane to Eikeland (2.4 km)
 from Fiane to Brokeland (0.5 km)
  Nybø
 Sundebru
 Sundebru
 to the county border at Høgstli → Kragerø
 from Egddalen to the county border at Øygarden →  (Telemark) to Øy in Åmli

References

418
Road transport in Agder
Risør
Gjerstad